Dalhousiea is a genus of flowering plants in the legume family, Fabaceae. It belongs to the subfamily Faboideae. It was named by Robert Graham after James Andrew Ramsey the 10th Earl of Dalhousie or alternatively after George Ramsay, 9th Earl of Dalhousie and Christian Ramsay, Countess of Dalhousie, for her work in the classification of Indian botany. Dalhousiea was traditionally assigned to the tribe Sophoreae; however, recent molecular phylogenetic analyses reassigned Dalhousiea into the Baphieae tribe.

Species
Dalhousiea comprises the following species:
 Dalhousiea africana S.Moore
 Dalhousiea bracteata (Roxb.) Benth.
 Dalhousiea paucisperma Griff.

Species names with uncertain taxonomic status
The status of the following species is unresolved:
 Dalhousiea haematoxylon Benth.
 Dalhousiea ovalifolia Benth.
 Dalhousiea pyrifolia (Desv.) Benth.

References

Baphieae
Fabaceae genera